Pictures is a 1981 New Zealand drama film directed by Michael Black. It was entered into the 12th Moscow International Film Festival.

Cast
 Kevin J. Wilson as Alfred Burton
 Peter Vere-Jones as Walter Burton
 Helen Moulder as Lydia Burton
 Elizabeth Coulter as Helen Burton
 Terence Bayler as John Rochfort
 Matiu Mareikura as Ngatai
 Ron Lynn as President of the Geographical Society
 John Callen as Casey
 Ken Blackburn as James Gilchrist

References

External links
 

1981 films
1981 drama films
New Zealand drama films
1980s English-language films